Governor Ford may refer to:

David Ford (civil servant) (1935–2017), Acting Governor of Hong Kong in 1992
Sam C. Ford (1882–1961), 12th Governor of Montana
Seabury Ford (1801–1855), 20th Governor of Ohio
Thomas Ford (politician) (1800–1850), 8th Governor of Illinois
Wendell Ford (1924–2015), 53rd Governor of Kentucky